Yevgeniy Yelezarenko (born 4 July 1993) is a Belarusian footballer who plays for Osipovichi.

External links
 
 
 Profile at Naftan website

1993 births
Living people
Belarusian footballers
Association football midfielders
FC Dinamo Minsk players
FC Naftan Novopolotsk players
FC Shakhtyor Soligorsk players
FC Gomel players
FC Slutsk players
FC Torpedo Minsk players
FC Lida players
FC Dnepr Mogilev players
FC Volna Pinsk players
FC Osipovichi players